Livro is an album by Caetano Veloso, released through the record label Nonesuch in 1998. In 2000, the album earned Veloso the Grammy Award for Best World Music Album and a Latin Grammy Award nomination for Album of the Year, in addition to winning the Latin Grammy Award for Best MPB Album.

Track listing
All songs by Veloso, unless noted otherwise.

 "Os Passistas (Carnaval Dancers)" – 3:23
 "Livros (Books)" – 4:31
 "Onde O Rio E Mais Baiano (Where Rio Is Most Bahian)" – 3:22
 "Manhatã (Para Lulu Santos) (For Lulu Santos)" – 5:17
 "Doideca" – 3:40
 "Voce É Minha (You Are Mine)" – 3:44
 "Um Tom" – 2:29
 "How Beautiful a Being Could Be" (Moreno Veloso)– 3:27
 "O Navio Negreiro (The Slave Ship) (Excerto)" (Castro Alves) – 5:17
 "Não Enche" (Don't Tease Me) – 3:31
 "Minha Voz, Minha Vida (My Voice, My Life)" – 2:50
 "Alexandre (Alexander)" – 5:48
 "Na Baixa Do Sapateiro (In Baixa Do Sapateiro)" (Ary Barroso) – 3:46
 "Pra Ninguém (For No One)" – 2:59

 The Latin Grammy nomination was shared with Jaques Morelenbaum (producer) and Moogie Canazio (engineer/mixer).

Certification

References

1998 albums
Caetano Veloso albums
Nonesuch Records albums
Grammy Award for Best World Music Album
Latin Grammy Award for Best MPB Album
Albums produced by Caetano Veloso